National Tertiary Route 938, or just Route 938 (or ) is a National Road Route of Costa Rica, located in the Guanacaste province.

Description
In Guanacaste province the route covers La Cruz canton (La Cruz district).

References

Highways in Costa Rica